Rumen Nikolov is a Bulgarian sprint canoer who competed in the mid-1990s. He won a bronze medal in the C-4 500 m event at the 1995 ICF Canoe Sprint World Championships in Duisburg.

References

Bulgarian male canoeists
Living people
Year of birth missing (living people)
ICF Canoe Sprint World Championships medalists in Canadian